Kingsburgh (Gaelic: Cinnseaborgh) is a scattered crofting township, overlooking Loch Snizort Beag  on the Trotternish peninsula of the Isle of Skye in the Highlands of Scotland. It is in the council area of Highland.

Kingsburgh is famous as the place that Flora MacDonald lived after helping  Bonnie Prince Charlie escape to France after his defeat at Culloden.

References

Populated places in the Isle of Skye